Deightoniella is a genus of fungi belonging to the family Magnaporthaceae.

The species of this genus are found in Europe.

The genus name of Deightoniella is in honour of Frederick Claude Deighton (1903 - 1992), British botanist (mycology) and plant pathologist.

The genus was circumscribed by Stanley John Hughes in Mycol. Pap. Vol.48 on page 27 in 1952.

Species

Species:

Deightoniella africana 
Deightoniella alni 
Deightoniella arecae

References

Magnaporthales
Sordariomycetes genera